Dirty Looks was an American rock band from Staten Island, New York, United States, formed in 1977. They are best known for the songs "Let Go" and "Tailing You", which were minor hits. Both videos were in rotation in the early days of MTV.

Background
Dirty Looks was formed in 1977 and began playing cover songs before writing a set of gritty pop songs inspired by the 1960s. The band consisted of singer/guitarist Patrick Barnes, drummer Peter Parker, and bassist Marco Sin. The band released two albums for Stiff Records in the UK (Epic Records in the US), Dirty Looks and Turn It Up, along with several singles. Their debut album was Stiff's biggest album release in the United States, selling over 100,000 copies in 1980. Turn It Up was originally produced and mixed by Nick Garvey (of The Motors), Epic Records decided they did not like the edgy approach and wanted a more mainstream sound.

The band was discovered by Squeeze bassist John Bentley at CBGB in New York. Bentley brought then Grand Funk Railroad manager Andy Cavaliere to the band's next show and he made the band sign a napkin promising to appear in his office the next day.

Their first album; Dirty Looks was first released in America and the band launched the record by appearing unannounced outside the New York offices of EPIC on a flat-bed truck complete with PA, drums etc., and a film crew. 52nd street became filled with lunch-time office workers all grooving to the band and a bunch of New York cops from the local precinct trying to fight their way through the crowd to stop the disturbance. The result was an arrest and a fifteen-minute movie of three Dirty Looks tracks.

In 1980, Dirty Looks came to the UK for the In the Son Of Stiff tour. With four other Stiff acts, Dirty Looks played 11 countries in 70 days and played 61 gigs. In Milan, they headlined in front of 6,000 fans and witnessed a fatal stabbing outside the concert hall. They are best known for the songs "Let Go" and "Tailing You", which were minor hits. Both videos were in rotation in the early days of MTV. By now Dirty Looks had released three singles: "Lie To Me", "Let Go" and "Tailing You".

In 1983, the group prepared demos for an unreleased third album, called 'Unsung Heroes'. Four tracks from it were included on 12 O'Clock High, an Italian career retrospective compilation, in 2002.

Bassist Marco Sin (born Marcus Robert Weissmann) died in 1995, following a lengthy history of substance abuse.

In February 2014, drummer Peter Parker (Minucci) worked with Omaha band, Naive Filter, to record two Dirty Looks originals; "Love Crimes" and "Kiss of Death".

Discography

Albums
  1980: Dirty Looks
  1981: Turn It Up

References

External links
 Stiff Records - Dirty Looks
 punkandoi
 Trouser Press
 lostbands
 Pop Matters

1977 establishments in New York City
American power pop groups
Musical groups established in 1977
Musical groups from Staten Island
Rock music groups from New York (state)